Francisco "Paco" Rueda (born December 21, 1983) is a Mexican footballer who most recently played for the Atlanta Silverbacks in the North American Soccer League.

Career
Rueda began his career with C.F. Monterrey where he made 15 league appearances from 2002 to 2006.  He then moved to Atlanta and played for amateur side Deportivo Guayabo.  After spending 2010 with La Piedad where he made six appearances, Rueda signed with the Atlanta Silverbacks in the North American Soccer League.

References

External links
Atlanta Silverbacks profile

1983 births
Living people
Footballers from Michoacán
Mexican footballers
People from La Piedad
C.F. Monterrey players
Atlanta Silverbacks players
Liga MX players
Association football midfielders